Ravat v Halliburton Manufacturing and Services Ltd [2012] UKSC 1 is a UK labour law case, concerning the test for when workers are covered by employment rights when they work abroad.

Facts
Mr Ravat worked for Halliburton Ltd, one of 70 subsidiaries in the Halliburton Inc group, from 1990 to 2006 as the Libyan accounts manager, where he reported to the Operations Manager, or to the Africa Region Finance Manager, Mr Strachan, based in Cairo. He was made redundant and claimed unfair dismissal in the Aberdeen Employment Tribunal. Halliburton argued they had no jurisdiction, because Mr Ravat worked in Libya. He spent 28 days there, and came back home to Preston for 28 days, travel paid by Halliburton, when he only checked the odd email, as under the ‘International Commuter Assignment Policy’. He had the same pay, tax and pension structure as UK employees, and was told in 2003 when he started in Libya that UK employment law would still govern the relationship. He was told he could pursue the UK grievance procedure over the redundancy. Mr Strachan took the dismissal decision under the Aberdeen human resources’ department's guidance, and the hearing was carried out in Aberdeen and the redundancy payment made like under UK law.

The Aberdeen Employment Tribunal, Mr RG Christie, held they did have jurisdiction to consider Mr Ravat's claim. The EAT, Lady Smith held that Mr Ravat did not have the right to be heard in the UK. The Court of Session held, by a majority, that Mr Ravat fell under ERA 1996 s 94. Lord Osborne held he was a peripatetic worker. Lord Carloway held he was an expatriate worker, but had a close connection with the UK. Lord Brodie, dissenting, held he was an expatriate worker, and did not have a close connection with the UK.

Judgment
Lord Hope held even if the place of work and business is not in the UK, English law can still apply if it is the most closely connected law. Lady Hale, Lord Brown, Lord Mance and Lord Kerr expressed their agreement.

See also

UK labour law

Notes

References

United Kingdom labour case law
2012 in case law
2012 in British law
Supreme Court of the United Kingdom cases
Halliburton